The Rheinsberg Lake Region with its many great and small lakes, lies in the richly-varied, gently rolling, forested countryside between the villages of Rheinsberg, Menz and Fürstenberg/Havel in the north German state of Brandenburg. It lies just to the south of the Neustrelitz Little Lakes Region, but has no natural link to the waterbodies to the north. However, the Rheinsberg Lake Region is linked to the Neustrelitz lakes via the Wolfsbruch Canal and Lock, the Müritz-Havel Waterway and the Upper Havel Waterway. It drains southwards to the River Havel through the Rhin and is bounded by Ruppin Switzerland to the south. The overwhelming part of the region belongs to the Stechlin-Ruppiner Land Nature Park. The Stechlin Nature Reserve, created in 1938, is well known.

Important lakes 
The best-known lake in the Rheinsberg Lake Region is Lake Stechlin (Stechlinsee). Other large lakes in the region are the:
Braminsee, Nehmitzsee, Großer Prebelowsee, Rheinsberger See, Roofensee, Schwarzer See, Tietzowsee, Großer Wummsee, Großer Zechliner See and Zootzensee.

Rheinsberg and Zechlin Waters 

The Rheinsberg Waters branch into the lake of Kleiner Pälitzsee from the Müritz-Havel Waterway.
The Rheinsberg Waters also include the 3 kilometre long Dollgow Canal and Dollgowsee that branch off the Schlabornsee towards the southwest.

The Rheinsberg and Zechlin Waters were Prussian waterbodies; only from 1921 to 1924 were they Reich Waterways. From 1990 they are Federal Waterways (Bundeswasserstraßen) and have belonged since 1998 to the so-called special inland waterways of the Federation. The Eberswalde Water and Shipping Authority (Wasser- und Schifffahrtsamt Eberswalde) is responsible for them.

Geology 
The Rheinsberg Lake Region belongs, in terms of its historical formation, to the Mecklenburg Lake District.

The region lies between the moraines of the Frankfurt Series and the Pomeranian Stage of the  Weichselian glaciation and was formed during that ice age about 12,000 years ago in the meltwater valleys and sandurs of the Pomeranian. It has relatively high levels of relief for Brandenburg. There are flat sandur areas, undulating ground moraines and elongated end moraines. In between them lie the tunnel valley lakes and kettle lakes. These lakes do not generally have natural surface head and tailwaters. They were later linked by canals.

Climate 
Climatically the region differs from the surrounding area due to its relief and its many lakes. There are many pockets of cold air (Kaltluftinseln). The cold air collects in hollows and is generally colder than that of the surrounding area. There are frequent early and late frosts. A high humidity and low average summer temperatures characterise the climate.

Vegetation 
The forests in this region are very varied. Its natural vegetation would be beech and beech-sessile oak woods. Today however it is dominated by Scots Pine and mixed pine woods. In smaller depressions and hollows today there are kettle bogs.

Literature 
The region became well-known through its coverage in the book Wanderungen durch die Mark Brandenburg ("Walks through the March of Brandenburg") by the eminent German writer, Theodor Fontane.

References

Sources 
 H.-J. Uhlemann, Berlin und die Märkischen Wasserstraßen, DSV-Verlag Hamburg 1994

External links 

 Interactive map.

Lakes of Brandenburg
Regions of Brandenburg
Federal waterways in Germany